Raymond Petit (18 January 1910 – 1 January 1990) was a French middle-distance runner. He competed in the men's 800 metres at the 1936 Summer Olympics.

References

1910 births
1990 deaths
Athletes (track and field) at the 1936 Summer Olympics
French male middle-distance runners
Olympic athletes of France
Place of birth missing